Brian Cole may refer to:
Brian Cole (bass guitarist) (1942–1972), American musician with The Association
B. J. Cole (Brian John Cole, born 1946), English pedal steel guitarist
Brian Cole (footballer) (born 1956), Australian footballer
Brian Lee Cole (born 1967), American bishop
Brian Cole (baseball) (1978–2001), American baseball outfielder
Brian Cole II (born 1997), American football safety